Hartung Münch von Landskron ( 1265 – 25 October 1332) was bishop of Basel from 1325 to 1328.

Early life
Hartung Münch was born about 1265, son of the Mayor of Basel Heinrich I. and Werentrudis von Wangen.

Literatur
 René Teuteberg: Basler Geschichte, 2nd edition, Christoph Merian Verlag, Basel 1988, p. 112.
 Aryeh Grabois: Enzyklopädie des Mittelalters. Atlantis Verlag, Zürich (no year, about 1988), p. 27.

External links
 Hartung Münch von Landskron auf altbasel.ch 

1260s births
1332 deaths
Prince-Bishops of Basel